List of psychoactive substances derived from artificial fungi biotransformation.

 4-HO-5-MeO-DMT (psilomethoxin) mushrooms derived from Psilocybe cubensis mycelium in substrate with added 5-MeO-DMT.
 4-HO-DET and 4-PO-DET mushrooms derived from Psilocybe cubensis mycelium in substrate with added DET.
 4-HO-DiPT mushrooms derived from Psilocybe cubensis mycelium in substrate with added DiPT.
 4-HO-DPT mushrooms derived from Psilocybe cubensis mycelium in substrate with added DPT.
 Baeocystin (4-PO-NMT) found in Psilocybe cubensis mushrooms from mycelium in substrate with added NMT.

See also
 List of psychoactive substances and precursor chemicals derived from genetically modified organisms

References

Drug-related lists
Biological sources of psychoactive drugs
Entheogens
Tryptamines
Psychedelic drugs